Vézina is a surname. Notable people with the surname include:

 Antoine Vézina (21st century), Canadian actor
 Frédérique Vézina (21st century), Canadian singer
 Georges Vézina (1887–1926), Canadian professional ice hockey goaltender
 Joseph Vézina (1849–1924), Canadian conductor
 Monique Vézina (born 1935), Canadian politician
 Pierre Vézina (1772–1852), Canadian politician

See also
Vezina Trophy, named after Georges Vézina